Digorsky District (Dygury rajon; Digorian: Дигори район, Digori rajon) is an administrative and municipal district (raion), one of the eight in the Republic of North Ossetia–Alania, Russia. It is located in the west of the republic. Its administrative center is the town of Digora. Population:  20,625 (2002 Census);  The population of Digora accounts for 56.1% of the district's total population.

References

Notes

Sources

Districts of North Ossetia–Alania